Avoti (commonly known as Avotu iela) is a neighbourhood of Riga, the capital of Latvia. It is named after Avotu iela (Avotu Street) which runs horizontally through the middle of the area.

References 
 Apkaimes.lv
 Cita Riga
 Diena
 LTV

Neighbourhoods in Riga